Swallow This Live: Flesh & Blood World Tour is a Poison concert video, recorded in southern California 1991. The concert featured from Poison's 1990/91 world tour in support of Poison's third studio album Flesh & Blood and was the first concert from the band to be released on VHS video. 

The live tracks from this concert also feature on the album Swallow This Live. It was shown in 2004 on VH1 Classic. 

Swallow This Live (The Album) was certified Gold in 2001 by the RIAA.

Track listing

 Look What The Cat Dragged In
 I Want Action
 Ride the Wind
 Life Goes On
 Let It Play
 Rikki's Solo
 Something to Believe In
 Good Love
 Poor Boy Blues
 Unskinny Bop
 Love On The Rocks
 C.C.'s Solo
 Every Rose Has Its Thorn
 Fallen Angel
 Your Mama Don't Dance
 Nothin' But a Good Time
 Talk Dirty To Me

Band Members
 Bret Michaels - lead vocals, rhythm guitars
 C.C. DeVille - lead guitar, backing vocals
 Bobby Dall - bass, piano, backing vocals
 Rikki Rockett - drums, percussion, backing vocals

References

External links
Official website
Poison Colombia
Poison Mexico

1992 video albums
Live video albums
Poison (American band) video albums
1992 live albums